Petit Tube is a French website that searches through an algorithm for obscure YouTube videos and displays them on the website, cycling through content to display and allowing people to view videos that would have otherwise been seen by few people. The website was launched in 2011. Its founder is Yann van der Cruyssen, a French digital artist.

Below the video, there are options allowing viewers to vote on videos, Cette vidéo est bien (This video is good) and Cette vidéo n'est pas bien (This video is not good).

References

External links
 Official website
 Whois Petit Tube

YouTube
French entertainment websites